Siglufjörður Airport or Siglufjordur Airport  is an airport serving Siglufjörður, Iceland.

See also
List of airports in Iceland
Transport in Iceland

References

External links
OurAirports - Siglufjörður
OpenStreetMap - Siglufjörður
 

Airports in Iceland